Postmortem is a crime fiction novel by author Patricia Cornwell and is her debut novel. The first book of the Dr. Kay Scarpetta series, it received the 1991 Edgar Award for Best First Novel.

Plot summary

The novel opens as Dr. Kay Scarpetta, Chief Medical Examiner for the Commonwealth of Virginia, receives an early-morning call from Sergeant Pete Marino, a homicide detective at the Richmond Police Department with whom Scarpetta has a tense working relationship.  She meets him at the scene of a woman's gruesome strangling, the latest in a string of unsolved murders in Richmond.

The killer leaves behind a few clues; among them are a mysterious substance which fluoresces under laser light, which was later on proved to be from a liquid soap which the killer used to wash his hands, traces of semen, and in the vicinity of the last murder, an unusual smell. Scarpetta and Marino work with FBI profiler Benton Wesley to attempt to piece together a profile of the killer. Initial evidence appears to point to the fourth victim's husband, but Scarpetta suspects otherwise despite Marino's insistence. The book references DNA profiling as a relatively new technique, and characters briefly bemoan the lack of a criminal DNA database which could provide better leads to suspects, given available evidence.

Meanwhile, in her personal life, Scarpetta must deal with the presence of her extremely precocious ten-year-old niece, Lucy, as well as an uncertain romantic relationship with the local Commonwealth's attorney.

During the investigation, a series of news leaks about the murders appear to be coming from a source within the medical examiner's office.  The leaks threaten Scarpetta's position, especially after she is forced to admit that her office database has been compromised.

Believing that the killer thrives on media attention and hoping to flush him out by provoking his ego, Scarpetta, Wesley, and local investigative reporter Abby Turnbull (whose sister was the fifth victim), conspire to release a news story which suggests that the killer has a distinctive body odour due to a rare metabolic disease and implies that the killer may be mentally disordered.

While attempting to find another link between the five murders, Scarpetta discovers that all five intended victims had recently called 911; she suspects that the killer is a 911 operator and chose his victims based on their voices.

Scarpetta is awakened in the middle of the night by the killer, who has broken into her home. As she attempts to reach for a gun she has nearby for protection, Marino bursts into her bedroom and shoots the intruder, having realized that the news article would make Scarpetta a likely target. Scarpetta's suspicion proves to be correct; the killer was a 911 dispatcher.

Characters in Postmortem
 Kay Scarpetta - chief medical examiner.
 Benton Wesley - FBI profiler. "He was FBI right down to his Florsheim shoes, a sharp featured man with prematurely silver hair suggesting a mellow disposition that wasn't there. He was lean and hard and looked like a trial lawyer in his precisely tailored khaki suit and blue silk paisley-printed tie. I couldn't recall ever seeing him in a shirt that wasn't white and lightly starched. He had a master's degree in psychology and had been a high school principal in Dallas before enlisting in the Bureau, where he worked first as a field agent, then undercover in fingering members of the Mafia, before ending up where he'd started, in a sense."
Dorothy Farinelli - Kay's sister and mother of Lucy that lives in Miami. Her current boyfriend is Ralph and previously she was with Andy, who has a pawn shop. Then she flies to Nevada to marry Jacob Blank. Kay says "my sister should never have been a mother. My sister should never have been Italian."
Lucy Farinelli - Kay's 10-year-old niece. Described as "a genius, an impossible little holy terror of enigmatic Latin descent whose father died when she was small. She had no one but my only sister, Dorothy, who was too caught up in writing children's books to worry much about her flesh-and-blood daughter."
 Pete Marino - detective sergeant in the Richmond Police Department. Described as "pushing fifty, with a face life had chewed on, and long wisps of greying hair parted low on one side and combed over his balding pate. At least six feet tall, he was bay-windowed from decades of bourbon or beer."
Norman Tanner - director of Public Safety
Abby Turnbull - reporter who obtains an inside information on the murders. 
Alvin Amburgey - The county commissioner and Kay's boss. He's from North Carolina and he previously worked in Sacramento, California.
Bill Boltz - The Commonwealth's attorney. He has a semi-secret relationship with Kay Scarpetta. He enjoys playing tennis.
Spiro Fortosis - professor of Criminal Psychiatry at University of Virginia. He and Kay know each other from the start of Kay's career.
Matt Petersen - Lori Petersen's husband. He attended Harvard University as an undergraduate, now he attends university in Charlottesville for a PhD in American Literature; he's also an actor who is playing in Amleto by William Shakespeare, and he's writing a dissertation about Tennessee Williams.
Roy McCorkle - aka Mr. Nobody; the serial killer, obtaining the information of the dead women through his job as a hotline operator

Victims
Brenda Steppe, a teacher at Quinton Elementary. She was from Georgia and she was Baptist. She was also a musician.
Patty Lewis, a writer that came from a rich family in the Shenandoah Valley
Cecile Tyler, receptionist in a financial society
Lori Anne Petersen, a surgeon that wanted to specialize in plastic surgery; she worked at VMC (Virginian Medical Center). She attended Brown College and then Harvard Medical School. Her family lives in Philadelphia.
Henna Yarborough - sister of Abby Turnbull. She was a professor at the School of Broadcasting. She was from North Carolina, and her ex-husband lives in Chapel Hill, North Carolina.

Major themes
The hunt for a skillful and mysterious "Mr Nobody" serial killer.

Literary significance and criticism
Postmortem, Patricia Cornwell's first novel, was published in 1990 following advice from editors at Mysterious Press to dump the then-male central character and to expand the character of Kay Scarpetta. The novel was a major success and won numerous literary awards.

The book is loosely based on the crimes of Timothy Wilson Spencer, Cornwell was working in the OCME at the time of his killings.

Awards and nominations
Patricia Cornwell received the Edgar, Creasey, Anthony and Macavity Awards and the French Prix du Roman d'Adventure for Postmortem.

Allusions to real life

 Richmond, where the story is mostly set  
Richmond International Airport
Ginter Park (Cecile Tyler's home)
Main Street (boutique)
James Monroe Building (where Amburgey works)
Virginia Commonwealth University (Abby Turnbull is near it)
West End (Dr Kay Scarpetta's home)
 Monticello  
 Charlottesville, where Lori Petersen's husband attends university to obtain a PhD in American Literature  
 University of Virginia, where Dr. Spiro Fortosis works 
 Williamsburg (Dr Kay Scarpetta and Bill Boltz go here together) 
 District of Columbia (Dr Kay Scarpetta and Bill Boltz go here together) 
 Georgetown University Law School (attended by Dr Kay Scarpetta) 
 Chapel Hill, North Carolina (where Henna's ex-husband lives) 
 Baltimore, Johns Hopkins School of Medicine (attended by Dr Kay Scarpetta) 
 New Orleans, French Quarter (summer theater tour of Lori Petersen's husband when he may have committed rape) 
 New York (Marino worked here; Dr Kay Scarpetta's favourite delicatessen shop on West Avenue) 
 Cornell University (attended by Dr Kay Scarpetta) 
 Waltham, Massachusetts (similar homicides occurred here) 
 Harvard University (attended as an undergraduate by Lori Petersen's husband) 
 Harvard Medical School (attended by Lori Petersen) 
 Miami (city where Dr Kay Scarpetta is born and where she returned after divorce)
Miami Seaquarium
Bayside Marketplace
Coconut Grove
 Coral Gables, Florida (Dr. Kay Scarpetta's friend works here as a judge in a district court) 
Everglades
Monkey Jungle
Biscayne Bay
Hialeah, Florida
 Mecklenburg, Virginia 
 Colonial Heights, Virginia 
 Fredericksburg, Virginia 
 James City County, Virginia 
 Chicago (a good friend of Dr Kay Scarpetta works here)

Cultural references

 Hamlet by William Shakespeare
 Tennessee Williams, American playwright 
 Stanley Kowalski
 Sweet Bird of Youth
 Truman Capote, American author
 Marquis de Sade
 Henrik Ibsen
 Agatha Christie
 Nero
 Adolf Hitler
 Richard Speck
 Ted Bundy
 John Wayne Gacy
 Mark David Chapman
 The Catcher in the Rye
 Wayne Williams
 Doris Betts
 Margaret Thatcher
 Rembrandt
 Gregg Carbo
 Norman Rockwell
 John Hinckley Jr.
 Ottis Toole
 Henry Lee Lucas
 Smokey and the Bandit (1977 film)
 Mutiny on the Bounty

References

External links
Author's Official Website
 Patricia Cornwell discusses Postmortem on the BBC World Book Club

1990 American novels
Novels by Patricia Cornwell
Edgar Award-winning works
Novels set in Richmond, Virginia
Anthony Award-winning works
Macavity Award-winning works
American crime novels
1990 debut novels